Bellinzago Novarese (Lombard: Branzagh) is a comune (municipality) in the Province of Novara in the Italian region of Piedmont, located about  northeast of Turin and about  north of Novara.

Bellinzago Novarese borders the following municipalities: Caltignaga, Cameri, Lonate Pozzolo, Momo, Nosate, and Oleggio.

Sport 
The association football club Sporting Bellinzago is based in Bellinzago.

References

External links
 Official website

Cities and towns in Piedmont